Stepanovo is a rural locality (a village) in Chaykovsky, Perm Krai, Russia. The population was 198 as of 2010. There are 4 streets.

Geography 
Stepanovo is located 39 km northeast of Chaykovsky. Koryaki BNP is the nearest rural locality.

References 

Rural localities in Chaykovsky urban okrug